The postorbital is one of the bones in vertebrate skulls which forms a portion of the dermal skull roof and, sometimes, a ring about the orbit. Generally, it is located behind the postfrontal and posteriorly to the orbital fenestra. In some vertebrates, the postorbital is fused with the postfrontal to create a postorbitofrontal. Birds have a separate postorbital as an embryo, but the bone fuses with the frontal before it hatches.

References 

 Roemer, A. S. 1956. Osteology of the Reptiles. University of Chicago Press. 772 pp.

Skull